Johannes Postmus (1877 – 1947) was the second Governor of the South African Reserve Bank. His term of office was from 1 January 1932 until 30 June 1945. He was succeeded by Michiel Hendrik de Kock.

References
Down Memory Lane: The Economic Society of South Africa, Past Presidents 1923-1963

1877 births
1947 deaths
Governors of the South African Reserve Bank